Rashmi Virag is the screen name of Rashmi Singh and Virag Mishra, an Indian lyricist duo active in Bollywood. At first, Singh and Mishra wrote lyrics themselves; in 2015, they began working as a duo. Singh won the Best Lyricist award at the 60th Filmfare Awards for the song "Muskurane" from the film CityLights.

Virag also wrote and directed a short film named Neelofar in 2017, starring Satish Kaushik and Harsh Vardhan Deo.

Rashmi Virag as Lyricist

Filmography

Single

Rashmi Singh as Lyricist

Filmography

Virag Mishra as Lyricist

Filmography

Rashmi Virag as Director

Filmography

Rashmi Singh Won Awards

References

External links

Indian lyricists
Living people
Year of birth missing (living people)